James Hazen Brickett Ayer (1788–1864) served as the eighth Mayor of Lowell, Massachusetts.

Prior to becoming mayor, Ayer served as the manager of the lumber department at Merrimack Mills, and as Paymaster for the Locks and Canals Company, both in Lowell.

References

1788 births
Mayors of Lowell, Massachusetts
Lowell, Massachusetts City Council members
Massachusetts Whigs
19th-century American politicians
1864 deaths